Toshio Ōtsu (October 26, 1893 – December 27, 1958) was the last Director of the Karafuto Agency (1943 – November 11, 1947). After the end of his tenure, the Agency was abolished with the incorporation of Karafuto into the Soviet Union. He was Governor of Saitama Prefecture (1942–1943). He was a graduate of the University of Tokyo. After the defeat of the Empire of Japan in World War II, he was interned by the Soviet authorities.

1893 births
1958 deaths
Governors of Saitama Prefecture
Directors of the Karafuto Agency
People of the Kwantung Leased Territory
Japanese Home Ministry government officials
University of Tokyo alumni
People from Fukuoka Prefecture
Siberian internees